Grain itch is a cutaneous condition caused by several types of mites, and characterized by intense pruritus.

See also 
 Grocer's itch
 List of cutaneous conditions
 List of mites associated with cutaneous reactions

References 

Parasitic infestations, stings, and bites of the skin